Kanstantsin Leonidovich Lukashyk (born September 18, 1975 in Hrodna) is a Belarusian pistol shooter, most known for winning the 50 metre pistol event at the 1992 Summer Olympics in Barcelona, at the age of 16. During his last shot, he raised his arm 4 times but kept his nerve and eventually pulled the trigger just seconds before the 75 second time limit ran out. He ended up scoring a 9.9 which was enough to beat a field of 5 other Olympic champions, including Ragnar Skanåker who was 42 years older than Lukashyk. As of 2023, he is the youngest Olympic champion in shooting 

The year before Barcelona, Lukashyk became both the World Junior Champion and European Junior Champion in the 10 meter air pistol event. He also won the free pistol event in the latter competition since it was available that year. These triumphs combined with a necessary win at the CIS championships in the free pistol right before Barcelona helped him get a spot on the Olympic team despite his age.

The year after Barcelona, Lukashyk set a junior world record in 10 metre air pistol (lasting until 2006), and has ever since been a regular member of the Belarusian national team, with varying results including some medals at ISSF World Cups.

He has competed at six Olympics so far, from 1992 to 2012.

References

External links
 Lukashyk's profile at ISSF NEWS
 

1975 births
Living people
Belarusian male sport shooters
ISSF pistol shooters
Olympic shooters of the Unified Team
Olympic shooters of Belarus
Shooters at the 1992 Summer Olympics
Shooters at the 1996 Summer Olympics
Shooters at the 2004 Summer Olympics
Shooters at the 2008 Summer Olympics
Shooters at the 2012 Summer Olympics
Olympic gold medalists for the Unified Team
Olympic medalists in shooting
Shooters at the 2015 European Games
European Games competitors for Belarus
Medalists at the 1992 Summer Olympics